Disposability is the fifth album by Steve Lacy and was released on the Italian RCA label in 1966 featuring three tunes written by Thelonious Monk, one by Cecil Taylor, one by Carla Bley and four by Lacy performed by Lacy, Aldo Romano and Kent Carter.

Reception
The Allmusic review awarded the album 4 stars.

Track listing
All compositions by Steve Lacy except as indicated
 "Shuffle Boil" (Thelonious Monk) - 5:17
 "Barble" - 3:25
 "Chary" - 2:51
 "Tune 2" (Cecil Taylor) - 8:26
 "Pannonica" (Monk) - 3:30
 "M's Transport" - 4:05
 "Comin'on The Hudson" (Monk) - 3:30
 "There We Were" - 3:02
 "Generous 1" (Carla Bley) - 3:40

Recorded in Rome, December 21 and 22, 1965

Personnel
Steve Lacy – soprano saxophone
Aldo Romano – drums
Kent Carter – bass

References

1966 albums
Steve Lacy (saxophonist) albums
RCA Records albums